Gryazinovsky is a rural locality (a khutor) in Tryasinovskoye Rural Settlement, Serafimovichsky District, Volgograd Oblast, Russia. The population was 38 as of 2010.

Geography 
Gryazinovsky is located 33 km northeast of Serafimovich (the district's administrative centre) by road. Perepolsky is the nearest rural locality.

References 

Rural localities in Serafimovichsky District